The ARIA Music Award for Breakthrough ArtistAlbum is an award presented at the annual ARIA Music Awards, which recognises "the many achievements of Aussie artists across all music genres", since 1987. It is handed out by the Australian Recording Industry Association (ARIA), an organisation whose aim is "to advance the interests of the Australian record industry." 
The award is given to an Australian group or solo artist who has had an album appear in the ARIA Top 100 Albums Chart between the eligibility period, and is voted for by a judging academy, which comprises 1000 members from different areas of the music industry. However, "artists and groups are not eligible if they, or any member of the group, has previously been a final five (5) nominee in any ARIA Awards category with an album, or if they have been in a group that has previously been a final five (5) nominee with an album, or if they have had a previous Top 50 Album in the ARIA Album Chart."

The award for Breakthrough ArtistAlbum was first presented to 1927 and Rockmelons in 1989 for their albums ...Ish (1988) and Tales of the City (1988), respectively. Boy & Bear were the last act to receive the accolade in 2011 for their album Moonfire (2011). This, and the ARIA Award for Breakthrough Artist – Single was merged in 2012 to form a single award for Breakthrough ArtistRelease.

Winners and nominees
In the following table, the winner is highlighted in a separate colour, and in boldface; the nominees are those that are not highlighted or in boldface. All reliable sources used in this article make no mention of nominees prior to 1992.

Notes

A: Despite the ARIA Awards website saying C. W. Stoneking was nominated for this award, the video for this award on the Official ARIA YouTube channel shows that Sia was nominated. This is the video: https://www.youtube.com/watch?v=DryNVmJ_AHs

B: In 2010, the Breakthrough Artist – Album award was merged with the Breakthrough Artist – Single accolade to form a sole award for Breakthrough Artist.

References

External links
The ARIA Awards Official website

B
Music awards for breakthrough artist
Album awards